Arno is an unincorporated community and coal town located in Wise County, Virginia, United States.

Notable people
Willie Horton (baseball), former MLB player (Detroit Tigers, Texas Rangers, Cleveland Indians, Oakland Athletics, Toronto Blue Jays, Seattle Mariners)

References

Unincorporated communities in Wise County, Virginia
Unincorporated communities in Virginia
Coal towns in Virginia